Central City is a city in Linn County, Iowa, United States. The population was 1,264 at the 2020 census. It is part of the Cedar Rapids Metropolitan Statistical Area.

History
Central City was founded in the 1850s. The name Central City refers to its location within proximity to railroads.

A section of the downtown area has been listed on the National Register of Historic Places as the Central City Commercial Historic District.

Geography
Central City is located at  (42.204544, -91.525013).

Demographics

2010 census
As of the census of 2010, there were 1,257 people, 522 households, and 351 families living in the city. The racial makeup of the city was 98.3% White, 0.6% African American, 0.2% Native American, 0.2% Asian, 0.1% from other races, and 0.6% from two or more races. Hispanic or Latino of any race were 1.2% of the population.

There were 522 households, of which 33.1% had children under the age of 18 living with them, 53.3% were married couples living together, 10.0% had a female householder with no husband present, 4.0% had a male householder with no wife present, and 32.8% were non-families. 27.0% of all households were made up of individuals, and 14.2% had someone living alone who was 65 years of age or older. The average household size was 2.41 and the average family size was 2.93.

The median age in the city was 39.5 years. 24.5% of residents were under the age of 18; 7.5% were between the ages of 18 and 24; 25.1% were from 25 to 44; 26.1% were from 45 to 64; and 16.7% were 65 years of age or older. The gender makeup of the city was 48.8% male and 51.2% female.

2000 census
As of the census of 2000, there were 1,157 people, 490 households, and 320 families living in the city. The racial makeup of the city was 98.96% White, 0.09% Native American, 0.09% Asian, and 0.86% from two or more races. Hispanic or Latino of any race were 0.52% of the population.

There were 490 households, out of which 31.4% had children under the age of 18 living with them, 54.1% were married couples living together, 7.6% had a female householder with no husband present, and 34.5% were non-families. 31.4% of all households were made up of individuals, and 19.0% had someone living alone who was 65 years of age or older. The average household size was 2.36 and the average family size was 2.97.

Age spread: 25.5% under the age of 18, 6.9% from 18 to 24, 28.6% from 25 to 44, 21.3% from 45 to 64, and 17.7% who were 65 years of age or older. The median age was 39 years. For every 100 females, there were 88.1 males. For every 100 females age 18 and over, there were 83.8 males.

The median income for a household in the city was $36,544, and the median income for a family was $49,318. Males had a median income of $33,083 versus $24,400 for females. The per capita income for the city was $18,800. About 1.3% of families and 3.3% of the population were below the poverty line, including 0.7% of those under age 18 and 8.5% of those age 65 or over.

Education
The Central City Community School District operates local area public schools.

References

Cities in Iowa
Cities in Linn County, Iowa
Cedar Rapids, Iowa metropolitan area
1850s establishments in Iowa